King Agron may refer to:
Agron of Illyria, King of the Ardiaean Illyrian Kingdom from 250 to 231 BC
Agron of Lydia, legendary fourth King of Maeonia